Thekla Carola Wied (born Thekla Wiedmann 5 February 1944) is a German actress educated in West Berlin at the Evangelisches Gymnasium zum Grauen Kloster. Her father was a teacher for Latin. After abitur she studied from 1965 till 1967 acting at Folkwang University of the Arts in Essen.
In 1989 she starred in Rivalen der Rennbahn.

Selected filmography
 Trace of a Girl (1967)
  (TV film, 1981)
 Derrick - Season 10, Episode 3: "Geheimnisse einer Nacht" (1983)
 Ich heirate eine Familie (TV series, 14 episodes, 1983–1986)
 Rivalen der Rennbahn (TV series, 4 episodes, 1989)
 Wie gut, dass es Maria gibt (TV series, 27 episodes, 1990–1991)
  (TV series, 39 episodes, 1993–2000)

External links

Sibylle Flöter Agency Munich 

German television actresses
1944 births
Living people
Best Actress German Film Award winners
German film actresses
20th-century German actresses
21st-century German actresses
Actors from Wrocław